Learner Building is a historic commercial building located in Kokomo, Indiana.  It was built by John Wesley Learner around 1904, and is a two-story, red brick building with a sloping flat roof. Learner was a prominent businessman in Kokomo, though he himself never had a business in the building. The Learner Building is 11 bays wide and has three commercial storefronts. It is a good example of late-19th century commercial architecture and features bold vertical brick patterns and limestone coursing.

It was listed on the National Register of Historic Places in 1984.

References

Kokomo, Indiana
Commercial buildings on the National Register of Historic Places in Indiana
Commercial buildings completed in 1904
Buildings and structures in Howard County, Indiana
National Register of Historic Places in Howard County, Indiana